The Sapphire Coast Australian Football League is an Australian rules football competition in the Sapphire Coast region of New South Wales, Australia.  The league was formed in 1984. The Far South Coast lies in the feeder area for the GWS club and AFL Hall of Fame member and four time premiership coach Kevin Sheedy assisted the representative team in 2014.

Clubs

Current

Bega and Tathra fielded a combined side for the 2016 season, although the clubs did not merge.

Previous

PremiersBega District News

2015 Ladder

2016 Ladder

2017 Ladder

2018 Ladder

2019 Ladder

See also

Group 16 Rugby League
AFL South Coast
Football South Coast
South Coast Open

References

South Coast (New South Wales)
Australian rules football competitions in New South Wales